Walter Stewart "Stu" Reichert (August 8, 1929 – October 31, 2021) was an American politician in the state of Kentucky. He served in the Kentucky Senate and in the Kentucky House of Representatives. He was a Republican.

References

Republican Party members of the Kentucky House of Representatives
Republican Party Kentucky state senators
Politicians from Louisville, Kentucky
2016 United States presidential electors
1929 births
2021 deaths